Destiny Rose is a 2015 Philippine television drama series broadcast by GMA Network. It premiered on the network's Afternoon Prime line up and worldwide on GMA Pinoy TV from September 14, 2015 to March 11, 2016 replacing Healing Hearts.

Mega Manila ratings are provided by AGB Nielsen Philippines.

Series overview

Episodes

September 2015

October 2015

November 2015

December 2015

January 2016

February 2016

March 2016

References

Lists of Philippine drama television series episodes